Viphada Jatuyosporn (born 8 October 1957) is a Thai voice actress. Throughout her life, she has been affiliated with Channel 9 (MCOT HD); she is also affiliated with TIGA, and Dream Express (DEX), where she has worked on numerous of Thai dubbed anime. Before started voice acting, she was worked as copywriter and newsreader in the 1980s, she also worked as director and TV producer for Channel 9. Viphada's first major role was Thai dubbed version of Usagi Tsukino in Sailor Moon aired on Channel 9 in the 1990s. Some of her major roles include Ran Mouri, Ai Haibara, Miwako Sato in Detective Conan series, Nami in One Piece series, Ryoma Echizen in The Prince of Tennis series and Kagome Higurashi in InuYasha.

Filmography

Voice over roles

Anime
 Goldfish Warning! (Channel 9 dub) – Wapiko
 Dragon Quest: Dai no Daibōken (Channel 9 dub) – Maam
 Cobra (Channel 9 dub) – Catherine Royal, Dominique Royal
 Idol Tenshi Youkoso Yōko  (Channel 9 dub)– Saki
 Ranma ½ (Channel 9 dub) – Tendo Akane, Tendo Nabiki
 Sailor Moon – Usagi Tsukino, Kaioh Michiru
 Hunter × Hunter (Channel 9 dub) – Killua Zoldyck
 Inuyasha – Higurashi Kagome, Kikyo, Kohaku
 Ojamajo Doremi (Channel 9 dub) – Aiko Senō, Onpu Segawa
 Glass Mask (Channel 9 dub) – Chigusa Tsukikage
 Rockman EXE – Rockman
 Mirmo! (Channel 9 dub) – Mirumo
 The Prince of Tennis – Ryoma Echizen, Sumire Ryuzaki
 Tokyo Mew Mew (Channel 9 dub) – Mint Aizawa
 You're Under Arrest! (Channel 9 dub) – Aoi Futaba
 Digimon Adventure (Channel 9 dub) – Sora Takenouchi, Agumon, Wizardmon
 Digimon Adventure 02 (Channel 9 dub) – Motomiya Daisuke, Wormmon
 Digimon Savers (Channel 9 dub) – Agumon, Relena Norstein, Noguchi Misuzu
 Inazuma Eleven (Channel 9 dub) – Natsumi Raimon, Kakeru Megane
 Futari wa Pretty Cure v – Nagisa Misumi
 Shonen Onmyouji v – Abe no Masahiro
 Futari wa Pretty Cure Splash Star (Channel 9 dub) – Saki Hyuuga
 Bakugan Battle Brawlers (Channel 9 dub) – Runo Misaki
 Bakugan New Vestroia (Channel 9 dub) – Mira Clay, Runo Misaki
 Beet the Vandel Buster (Channel 9 dub) – Poala
 Beyblade: Metal Fusion (Channel 9 dub) – Madoka Amano
 Fairy Tail (Channel 9 dub) – Lucy Heartfilia
 Battle Spirits: Shounen Toppa Bashin (Channel 9 dub) – J (Juri Sawaragi)
 Neon Genesis Evangelion – Rei Ayanami, Misato Katsuragi
 Sailor Moon – Usagi Tsukino, Kaioh Michiru
 Detective Conan – Mouri Ran, Haibara Ai, Sato Miwako
 High School of the Dead – Rei Miyamoto
 Tokyo Mew Mew – Zakuro Fujiwara, Mint Aizawa
 Hellsing – Integra Hellsing
 Girls und Panzer – Miho Nishizumi
 Burst Angel – Megumi (Meg)
 Blue Dragon – Shu
 Moeyo Ken – Yuko Kondo
 Love Hina – Mutsumi Otohime, Kaolla Su
 Hikaru no Go – Shindo Hikaru
 Godannar – Anna Aoi/Saruwatari
 Nadia: The Secret of Blue Water – Nadia
 The King of Braves GaoGaiGar – Mikoto Utsugi
 Inuyasha – Higurashi Kagome, Kohaku
 Kannazuki no Miko – Himeko Kurusugawa, Nekoko
 Beyblade – Ray Kon, Kyouju
 D.N. Angel – Harada Riku
 City Hunter – Makimura Kaori
 Clamp School Detectives – Nokoru Imonoyama
 Oh My Goddess! – Skuld
 The Mythical Detective Loki Ragnarok – Loki
 Azumanga Daioh – Chiyo Mihama, Sakaki
 Full Metal Panic – Kaname Chidori
 Great Teacher Onizuka – Azusa Fuyutsuki, Aizawa Miyabi
 Mobile Suit Gundam SEED – Lacus Clyne, Murrue Ramius
 Mobile Suit Gundam SEED Destiny – Lacus Clyne, Murrue Ramius, Meer Campbell, Stella Loussier, Meyrin Hawke
 Mobile Suit Gundam: The 08th MS Team Aina Sahalin, Kiki Rosita
 Mobile Suit Gundam 00 – Christina Sierra
 Tenjho Tenge – Maya Natsume
 Fruits Basket – Yuki Sohma, Saki Hanajima
 Dragon Ball – Bulma, Krillin
 Dragon Ball Z – Chi Chi, Son Gohan
 Dragon Ball GT – Young Son Goku
 Fullmetal Alchemist – Winry Rockbell, Young Edward Elric
 Fafner in the Azure – Tomi Maya
 Midori Days – Takako Ayase
 Zatch Bell! – Sherry Belmont, Megumi Oumi, Kanchomé
 Yakitate!! Japan – Kazuma Azuma, Azusagawa Yukino
 Gintama – Kagura (Season 1)
 Detective School Q – Kyū Renjō
 Negima! Magister Negi Magi – Asuna Kagurazaka
 Magical Girl Lyrical Nanoha – Fate Testarossa
 Magical Girl Lyrical Nanoha A's – Fate Testarossa, Shamal
 Magical Girl Lyrical Nanoha StrikerS – Fate Testarossa, Shamal, Subaru Nakajima
 My-HiME – Tokiha Mai, Shizuru Fujino, Akira Okuzaki
 My-Otome – Arika Yumemiya, Shizuru Viola
 Fate/stay night – Saber, Taiga Fujimura
 Anpanman – Anpanman
 Tiger & Bunny – Karina Lyle
 Eureka Seven – Eureka, Hilda
 xxxHolic – Yūko Ichihara
 Cardcaptor Sakura – Shaoran Li, Tomoyo Daidouji
 Kiddy Grade – Éclair
 Yu-Gi-Oh! Duel Monsters – Anzu Mazaki
 Saint Seiya – Saori Kido, Eagle Marin
 Ultimate Muscle – Rinko Nikaidō, Bibinba Kinniku (Mantaro's Mother)
 Shin Mazinger Shougeki! Z Hen – Sayaka Yumi, Tsubasa Nishikiori, Gamia Q
 Shaman King – Asakura Yoh, Kyoyama Anna
 Digimon Tamers – Makino Ruki Guilmon
 Digimon Frontier – Orimoto Izumi, Fairymon
 Digimon Savers – Agumon, Yoshi Fujieda
 Ouran High School Host Club – Fujioka Haruhi
 Hell Girl – Enma Ai
 School Rumble – Sawachika Eri, Tsukamoto Yakumo
 Shakugan no Shana – Shana (Season 1)
 Gurren Lagann – Yoko Littner
 Code Geass – C.C., Shirley Fenette, Euphemia li Britannia, Villetta Nu, Inoue, Jiang Lihua, Monica Kruszewski, Guinevere su Britannia
 One Piece – Nami
 Toradora! – Kushieda Minori, Kawashima Ami, Takasu Yasuko
 Eden of the East – Saki Morimi
 Cyborg Kuro-chan - Kuro.

Tokusatsu dubbing 
 Battle Fever J – Diane Martin, María Nagisa
 Denshi Sentai Denziman – Akira Momoi
 Chikyuu Sentai Fiveman – Kazumi Hoshikawa
 Chōjin Sentai Jetman – Ako Hayasaka
 Kyōryū Sentai Zyuranger – Boi
 Gosei Sentai Dairanger – Lin (Hououranger)
 Chouriki Sentai Ohranger – Momo Marou (Oh Pink)
 Mirai Sentai Timeranger – Lila
 GoGo Sentai Boukenger – Sakura Nishihori (Bouken Pink)
 Juken Sentai Gekiranger – Ran Uzaki
 Kamen Rider Kuuga – Sakurako Sawatari
 Kamen Rider Agito – Mana Kazaya, Risa Fukami
 Kamen Rider Ryuki – Miho Kirishima
 Kamen Rider 555 – Mari Sonoda, Saeko Kageyama
 Kamen Rider Blade – Shiori Hirose
 Kamen Rider Hibiki – Hinaka Tachibana
 Kamen Rider Kabuto – Hiyori Kusakabe, Yuzuki Misaki, Renge Takatori
 Kamen Rider Den-O – Naomi, Airi Nogami
 Ultraman Max – Mizuki Koishikawa, Yukari Yoshinaga
 Ultraman Mebius – Marina Kazama, Yuki Misaki
 K-tai Investigator 7 – Chigusa Mimasaka

TV program dubbing
 Kasou Taishou 
 Beyond Tomorrow

References

Viphada Jatuyosporn
1957 births
Living people